Myanmar participated in the 2014 Asian Para Games in Incheon, South Korea, from 18 to 25 October 2014. Athletes from Myanmar competed in Archery, Athletics, Sitting Volleyball and Swimming. Myanmar won 1 gold medal, 1 silver medal, 5 bronze medals and finished 26th in the medal table.Myanmar won first gold medal at Asian Para Games.

References 

Nations at the 2014 Asian Para Games
2014 in Burmese sport
2014